Dan Crippen (born March 18, 1952, in Canistota, South Dakota) was the executive director of the National Governors Association from 2011 to 2015. He now serves as member of the Board of Trustees to the Center for Health Care Strategies, Inc. and a member of the advisory board of the Peterson Center on Healthcare. He is a former director of the Congressional Budget Office and assistant to the president for Ronald Reagan. Crippen served on NASA's Aerospace Safety Advisory Panel.  He graduated from the University of South Dakota (B.S. 1974) and Ohio State University (M.A. 1976; Ph.D. 1981).

Reagan years
From 1981-1985 Crippen served as chief counsel and economic policy advisor for Senate Minority Leader Howard Baker.  When Baker became President Reagan's Chief of Staff in 1987, Crippen followed Baker to the White House as Deputy Assistant to the President for Domestic Policy from 1987-1988 and Domestic Policy Advisor and Assistant to the President for Domestic Policy from 1988-1989.  Republicans hoped that Crippen would be a strong proponent of Reagan's appropriations bills and that he could mend relations with Congress.  After Reagan left office in 1989, Crippen turned to the private sector, as a principal of Washington Counsel (1996-1999), a law and lobbying firm; Merrill Lynch as an executive director; and The Duberstein Group, a public relations consulting firm, as founder and vice president.

Congressional Budget Office
He was Director of the Congressional Budget Office from 1999-02-01 to 2003.  Republican leaders selected Crippen as a somewhat moderate candidate, drawing the ire of members of both parties, who sought a more ideological director.  A 2003 article in The Wall Street Journal suggested that he may have lost his chance at reappointment for failing to support dynamic scoring, a practice inspired by supply-side economics.

NASA and present day
On July 28, 2004 NASA Administrator Sean O'Keefe selected him to serve on NASA's Aerospace Safety Advisory Panel (ASAP).

He was also a member of the Stafford-Covey Return to Flight Task Group, which helped set policies to return the Space Shuttle to flight after the Space Shuttle Columbia disaster.

In February 2005, he was briefly mentioned as a possible NASA Administrator.

Crippen still works in the private sector, largely focusing on healthcare issues, and does some public speaking.  In a 2005 editorial in The Washington Post, Crippen called for increased use of technology to reduce healthcare costs, altering the service structure by delegating more services to nurses and other hospital staff, and studying the subset of the Medicare population which uses the majority of the resources.  Crippen serves on the board of directors of Eclipsys.

In early 2011, Crippen was named executive director of the National Governors Association. He served in that position until 2015. He also served on the board of directors of the Committee for a Responsible Federal Budget.

In 2012 Crippen was elected a fellow of the National Academy of Public Administration.

Notes or references

Further reading
Statement of Dan Crippen: The Relationship between Health Care Costs and America's Uninsured, before Subcommittee on Employer-Employee Relations, U.S. House of Representatives.  1999-06-11.  Retrieved on 2006-07-19.
Statement of Dan L. Crippen: Social Security: Long-Term Budget Implications, before the Committee on the Budget,  U.s. House of Representatives.  2002-06-19.  Retrieved on 2006-07-19.
Seeing Red, Online NewsHour, Public Broadcasting Service. 2004-03-24.  Retrieved on 2006-07-19.
NASA website

|-

1952 births
Directors of the Congressional Budget Office
Living people
People from McCook County, South Dakota
South Dakota Republicans
John Glenn College of Public Affairs alumni